Enrique Serrano is a retired American soccer player who coaches boys' high school soccer.  He played professionally in the USISL and was the 1989-1990 SISL goal scoring leader.

During the 1989–90 Southwest Independent Soccer League season, Serrano led the league in scoring while playing for the Albuquerque Gunners top scorer  In 1991, he joined the New Mexico Chiles where he played four outdoor seasons.  He also spent the 1991-92 indoor season with the Amarillo Challengers.

In 1995, Serrano became the head coach of the La Cueva High School girls' team.  He took the team to the 1995 and 1997 New Mexico State High School championship.  In 2012, he became the head coach of the West Mesa High School girls' team.

References

Living people
American soccer players
New Mexico Roadrunners players
New Mexico Chiles (USISL) players
USISL players
Association football midfielders
Association football forwards
Year of birth missing (living people)
High school soccer coaches in the United States